Mount Jefferson is a mountain located in Ashe County, North Carolina. The mountain is part of the Mount Jefferson State Natural Area.

A paved road leads to the mountain's summit; on a clear day the summit affords sweeping views of the surrounding countryside, the towns of Jefferson and West Jefferson, and the Appalachian Mountains in Virginia, Tennessee, and North Carolina.

The mountain has a secondary peak at the eastern end of its ridge which is marked as Luther Rock on trails and as Luther Overlook on USGS maps.

History
Before the American Civil War the mountain was a popular hiding place for slaves who had escaped from their captors in the central and eastern sections of North Carolina. As a result, legend has it, the peak was named "Nigger Mountain," According to another source, Nigger Mountain was named from its black granite coloration. It was later called "Larson Mountain" for many years until finally, in an effort to find a name that is not an ethnic slur, the mountain was renamed Mount Jefferson after the town at its base.

See also
 Mount Jefferson State Natural Area

References

External links
 North Carolina State Park - Mount Jefferson
 

Jefferson
Mountains of Ashe County, North Carolina